Old World warblers are a large group of birds formerly grouped together in the bird family Sylviidae. They are not closely related to the New World warblers. The family held over 400 species in over 70 genera, and were the source of much taxonomic confusion. Two families were split out initially, the cisticolas into Cisticolidae and the kinglets into Regulidae. In the past ten years they have been the subject of much research and many species are now placed into other families, including the Acrocephalidae, Cettiidae, Phylloscopidae, and Megaluridae. In addition some species have been moved into existing families or have not yet had their placement fully resolved. A smaller number of warblers, together with some babblers formerly placed in the family Timaliidae and the parrotbills, are retained in a much smaller family Sylviidae.

Characteristics 

Most Old World warblers are of generally undistinguished appearance, though some Asian species are boldly marked. The sexes are often identical, but may be clearly distinct, notably in the genus Sylvia. They are of small to medium size, varying from 9 to 16 centimetres in length, with a small, finely pointed bill. Almost all species are primarily insectivorous, although some will also eat fruit, nectar, or tiny seeds.

The majority of species are monogamous and build simple, cup-shaped nests in dense vegetation. They lay between two and six eggs per clutch, depending on species. Both parents typically help in raising the young, which are able to fly at around two weeks of age.

Systematics 

In the late 20th century, the Sylviidae were thought to unite nearly 300 small insectivorous bird species in nearly 50 genera. They had themselves been split out of the Muscicapidae. The latter family had for most of its existence served as perhaps the ultimate wastebin taxon in the history of ornithology. By the early 20th century, about every insectivorous Old World "songster" known to science had at one point been placed therein, and most continued to be so.

Only after the mid-20th century did the dismantling of the "pan-Muscicapidae" begin in earnest. However, the Sylviidae remained a huge family, with few clear patterns of relationships recognisable. Though by no means as diverse as the Timaliidae (Old World babblers) (another "wastebin taxon" containing more thrush-like forms), the frontiers between the former "pan-Muscicapidae" were much blurred. The largely southern warbler family Cisticolidae was traditionally included in the Sylviidae. The kinglets, a small genus in a monotypic family Regulidae, were also frequently placed in this family. The American Ornithologists' Union includes the gnatcatchers, as subfamily Polioptilinae, in the Sylviidae.

Sibley & Ahlquist (1990) united the "Old World warblers" with the babblers and other taxa in a superfamily Sylvioidea as a result of DNA–DNA hybridisation studies. This demonstrated that the Muscicapidae as initially defined were a form taxon which collected entirely unrelated songbirds. Consequently, the monophyly of the individual "songster" lineages themselves was increasingly being questioned.

More recently, analysis of DNA sequence data has provided information on the Sylvioidea. Usually, the scope of the clade was vastly underestimated and only one or two specimens were sampled for each presumed "family". Minor or little-known groups such as the parrotbills were left out entirely (e.g. Ericson & Johansson 2003, Barker et al. 2004). These could only confirm that the Cisticolidae were indeed distinct, and suggested that bulbuls (Pycnonotidae) were apparently the closest relatives of a group containing Sylviidae, Timaliidae, cisticolids and white-eyes.

In 2003, a study of Timaliidae relationships (Cibois 2003a) using mtDNA cytochrome b and 12S/16S rRNA data indicated that the Sylviidae and Old World babblers were not reciprocally monophyletic to each other. Moreover, Sylvia, the type genus of the Sylviidae, turned out to be closer to taxa such as the yellow-eyed babbler (Chrysomma sinense) (traditionally held to be an atypical timaliid) and the wrentit (Chamaea fasciata), an enigmatic species generally held to be the only American Old World babbler. The parrotbills, formerly considered a family Paradoxornithidae (roughly, "puzzling birds") of unclear affiliations also were part of what apparently was a well distinctive clade.

Cibois suggested that the Sylviidae should officially be suppressed by the ICZN as a taxon and the genus Sylvia merged into the Timaliidae (Cibois 2003b), but doubts remained. Clearly, the sheer extent of the groups concerned made it necessary to study a wide range of taxa. This was begun by Beresford et al. (2005) and Alström et al. (2006). They determined that the late-20th-century Sylviidae united at least four, but probably as many as seven major distinct lineages. The authors propose the creation of several new families (Phylloscopidae, Cettiidae, Acrocephalidae, Megaluridae) to better reflect the evolutionary history of the sylvioid group.

The Sylviidae, in turn, receive several taxa from other families. Nonetheless, the now-monophyletic family has shrunk by nearly 80% for the time being, now containing 55 species in 10 genera at least. It is entirely likely however that with further research, other taxa from those still incertae sedis among its former contents, the Timaliidae, the Cisticolinae, or even the Muscicapidae will be moved into this group.

Species

Family Sylviidae sensu stricto
True warblers (or sylviid warblers) and parrotbills. A fairly diverse group of smallish taxa with longish tails. Mostly in Asia, to a lesser extent in Africa. A few range into Europe; one monotypic genus on the west coast of North America.

 Genus Sylvia – typical warblers (c. 20 species). Paraphyletic or contains Parisoma
 Temperate Eurasian superspecies ("atricapilla-borin group")
 Eurasian blackcap, Sylvia atricapilla
 Garden warbler, Sylvia borin
 Parisoma superspecies
 Brown parisoma, Sylvia lugens
 Banded parisoma, Sylvia boehmi
 Layard's warbler, Sylvia layardi
 Chestnut-vented warbler, Sylvia subcaeruleum
 curruca clade
 Yemen warbler, Sylvia buryi – sometimes placed in Parisoma
 Arabian warbler, Sylvia leucomelaena
 Western Orphean warbler, Sylvia hortensis
 Eastern Orphean warbler, Sylvia crassirostris
 Lesser whitethroat, Sylvia curruca
 Hume's whitethroat, Sylvia althaea
 Desert whitethroat, Sylvia minula
 Margelanic whitethroat, Sylvia (minula) margelanica
 communis-melanocephala assemblage
 Barred warbler, Sylvia nisoria – tentatively place here
 Asian desert warbler, Sylvia nana
 African desert warbler, Sylvia deserti
 Common whitethroat, Sylvia communis
 Spectacled warbler, Sylvia conspicillata
 Tristram's warbler, Sylvia deserticola
 Dartford warbler, Sylvia undata
 Marmora's warbler, Sylvia sarda
 Balearic warbler, Sylvia balearica
 Rüppell's warbler, Sylvia rueppelli
 Cyprus warbler, Sylvia melanothorax
 Western subalpine warbler, Sylvia iberiae
 Eastern subalpine warbler, Sylvia cantillans
 Moltoni's warbler, Sylvia subalpina
 Sardinian warbler, Sylvia melanocephala
 Sylvia (melanocephala) momus
 Fayyum warbler, Sylvia melanocephala/momus norissae – doubtfully distinct, extinct (c. 1940)
 Menetries's warbler, Sylvia mystacea

 Genus Pseudoalcippe – African hill babbler. Formerly in Illadopsis (Timaliidae)
 Genus Rhopophilus – Chinese hill warbler. Formerly in Cisticolidae
 Genus Lioparus – golden-breasted fulvetta. Formerly in Alcippe (Timaliidae)
 Genus Paradoxornis – typical parrotbills (18 species). Formerly in Paradoxornithidae; polyphyletic
 Genus Conostoma – great parrotbill. Formerly in Paradoxornithidae; tentatively placed here
 Genus Fulvetta – typical fulvettas (7 species). Formerly in Alcippe (Timaliidae)
 Genus Chrysomma – 3 species. Formerly in Timaliidae
 Genus Chamaea – wrentit

Moved to family Pellorneidae
 Genus Graminicola
 Rufous-rumped grassbird ("-babbler") Graminicola bengalensis

Moved to family Cisticolidae
 Genus Bathmocercus – rufous-warblers
 Black-capped rufous-warbler, Bathmocercus cerviniventris
 Black-faced rufous-warbler, Bathmocercus rufus
 Genus Sceptomycter – sometimes merged into Bathmocercus. Cisticolidae?
 Mrs Moreau's warbler, Sceptomycter winifredae
 Genus Poliolais – Cisticolidae or more basal like bulbuls?
 White-tailed warbler, Poliolais lopezi
 Two to 14 of the 15 tailorbirds

Moved to family Acrocephalidae

Marsh and tree warblers or acrocephalid warblers. Usually rather large "warblers", most are olivaceous brown above with much yellow to beige below. Usually in open woodland, reed beds or tall grass. Mainly southern Asia to western Europe and surroundings ranging far into Pacific, some in Africa. The genus limits are seriously in need of revision; either most species are moved into Acrocephalus, or the latter is split up though there is presently insufficient knowledge as to how.

 Genus Acrocephalus – marsh warblers (about 35 species)
 Genus Hippolais – tree warblers (8 species)
 Genus Chloropeta – yellow warblers (3 species)
 Genus Nesillas – brush warblers (4 living species, 1 recently extinct)

Moved to Malagasy warblers
See Cibois et al. (2001)
 Genus Thamnornis
 Thamnornis, Thamnornis chloropetoides
 Genus Cryptosylvicola
 Cryptic warbler, Cryptosylvicola randriansoloi

Moved to family Locustellidae

Grass warblers and allies. Mid-sized and usually long-tailed species; sometimes strongly patterned but generally very drab in overall colouration. Often forage on the ground. Old World and into Australian region, centred on the Indian Ocean; possibly also one species in South America. A not too robustly supported clade that requires further study.

 Genus Bradypterus – megalurid bush-warblers (11 species)
 Genus Locustella – grass warblers (more than 20 species)
 Genus Megalurus – typical grassbirds (10 species)
 Genus Amphilais – grey emutail
 Genus Elaphrornis – Sri Lanka bush warbler
 Genus Schoenicola – (2 species)
 Genus Buettikoferella – buff-banded thicketbird
 Genus Chaetornis – bristled grassbird

The black-capped donacobius, Donacobius atricapillus, which was long considered an aberrant wren or mockingbird is apparently quite closely related, and might possibly be considered the only American species of this family.

Moved to family Cettiidae
Typical bush warblers and relatives or cettiid warblers. Another group of generally very drab species, tend to be smaller and shorter-tailed than Megaluridae. Usually frequent shrubland and undergrowth. Continental Asia, and surrounding regions, ranging into Africa and southern Europe.

 Genus Pholidornis – formerly in Remizidae; tentatively placed here
 Tit hylia, Pholidornis rushiae
 Genus Hylia – tentatively placed here 
 Green hylia, Hylia prasina
 Genus Abroscopus – Abroscopus warblers
 Rufous-faced warbler, Abroscopus albogularis
 Yellow-bellied warbler, Abroscopus superciliaris
 Black-faced warbler, Abroscopus schisticeps

 Genus Erythrocercus – monarch-warblers. Formerly Monarchinae.
 Chestnut-capped flycatcher, Erythrocercus mccallii
 Little yellow flycatcher, Erythrocercus holochlorus
 Livingstone's flycatcher, Erythrocercus livingstonei
 Genus Urosphena – stubtails
 Timor stubtail, Urosphena subulata
 Babar stubtail, Urosphena subulata advena – extinct (mid-20th century)
 Bornean stubtail, Urosphena whiteheadi
 Asian stubtail, Urosphena squameiceps
 Pale-footed bush warbler, Urosphena pallidipes
 Neumann's warbler, Urosphena neumanni
 Genus Tesia – tesias
 Javan tesia, tesia superciliaris
 Slaty-bellied tesia, Tesia olivea
 Grey-bellied tesia, Tesia cyaniventer
 Russet-capped tesia, Tesia everetti
 Genus Horornis – bush warblers (some 13 species).
 Genus Cettia – bush warblers (4 species).
 Genus Tickellia
 Broad-billed warbler, Tickellia hodgsoni
 Genus Phyllergates
 Mountain tailorbird, Phyllergates cucullatus
 Rufous-headed tailorbird, Phyllergates heterolaemus

Moved to family Aegithalidae
 Genus Leptopoecile – tit-warblers. Tentatively placed there.
 White-browed tit-warbler, Leptopoecile sophiae
 Crested tit-warbler, Leptopoecile elegans

Moved to family Phylloscopidae
Leaf warblers or phylloscopid warblers. A group very variable in size, often vivid green colouration above and yellow below, or more subdued with greyish-green to greyish-brown plumage. Catch food on the wing fairly often. Eurasia, ranging into Wallacea and Africa.

 Genus Phylloscopus – leaf warblers (c. 55 species). (includes former genus Seicercus)
 Green-crowned warbler, Phylloscopus burkii
 Grey-crowned warbler, Phylloscopus tephrocephalus
 Whistler's warbler, Phylloscopus whistleri
 Bianchi's warbler, Phylloscopus valentini
 Martens's warbler, Phylloscopus omeiensis
 Alström's warbler, Seicercus soror
 White-spectacled warbler, Phylloscopus affinis – paraphyletic
 Bar-winged white-spectacled warbler, Seicercus (affinis) intermedius
 Grey-cheeked warbler, Phylloscopus poliogenys
 Chestnut-crowned warbler, Phylloscopus castaniceps
 Yellow-breasted warbler, Phylloscopus montis
 Sunda warbler, Phylloscopus grammiceps

Moved to family Macrosphenidae
African warblers. Also "Sphenoeacus group". An assemblage of usually species-poor and apparently rather ancient "odd warblers" from Africa. Ecomorphologically quite variable. Monophyly requires confirmation.

 Genus Sylvietta – crombecs
 Green crombec, Sylvietta virens
 Lemon-bellied crombec, Sylvietta denti
 White-browed crombec, Sylvietta leucophrys
 Chapin's crombec, Sylvietta (leucophrys) chapini – possibly extinct (late 20th century?)
 Northern crombec, Sylvietta brachyura
 Philippa's crombec, Sylvietta philippae
 Red-capped crombec, Sylvietta ruficapilla
 Red-faced crombec, Sylvietta whytii
 Somali crombec, Sylvietta isabellina
 Long-billed crombec, Sylvietta rufescens
 Genus Melocichla
 Moustached grass warbler, Melocichla mentalis
 Genus Achaetops
 Rockrunner, Achaetops pycnopygius
 Genus Sphenoeacus
 Cape grassbird, Sphenoeacus afer
 Genus Cryptillas.
 Victorin's warbler, Cryptillas victorini
 Genus Macrosphenus – longbills
 Kemp's longbill, Macrosphenus kempi
 Yellow longbill, Macrosphenus flavicans
 Grey longbill, Macrosphenus concolor
 Pulitzer's longbill, Macrosphenus pulitzeri
 Kretschmer's longbill, Macrosphenus kretschmeri

"Sylviidae" incertae sedis
Taxa that have not been studied. Most are likely to belong to one of Sylvioidea families listed above. Those in the Australian-Pacific region are probably Megaluridae. These taxa are listed in the sequence used in recent years.

 Genus Dromaeocercus – emutails. Locustelidae?
 Brown emutail, Dromaeocercus brunneus
 Grey emutail, Dromaeocercus seebohmi – sometimes separated in Amphilais
 Genus Phyllolais – Cisticolidae?
 Buff-bellied warbler, Phyllolais pulchella
 Genus Graueria
 Grauer's warbler, Graueria vittata
 Genus Eremomela – eremomelas. Cettiidae?
 Salvadori's eremomela, Eremomela salvadorii
 Yellow-vented eremomela, Eremomela flavicrissalis
 Yellow-bellied eremomela, Eremomela icteropygialis
 Senegal eremomela, Eremomela canescens
 Green-backed eremomela, Eremomela pusilla
 Green-capped eremomela, Eremomela scotops
 Yellow-rumped eremomela, Eremomela gregalis
 Rufous-crowned eremomela, Eremomela badiceps
 Turner's eremomela, Eremomela turneri
 Western Turner's eremomela, Eremomela turneri kalindei – probably extinct (early 1980s?)
 Black-necked eremomela, Eremomela atricollis
 Burnt-neck eremomela, Eremomela usticollis
 Genus Randia – Malagasy warblers?
 Rand's warbler, Randia pseudozosterops
 Genus Bowdleria – fernbirds. Sometimes merged into Megalurus. Locustellidae?
 Fernbird, Bowdleria punctata
 Chatham fernbird, Bowdleria rufescens – extinct (c. 1900)
 Genus Chaetornis – bristled grassbird. Locustellidae?
 Genus Schoenicola – grassbirds. Basal Locustellidae?
 Broad-tailed grassbird, Schoenicola platyura
 Fan-tailed grassbird, Schoenicola brevirostris
 Genus Cincloramphus – songlarks. Basal Locustellidae?
 Brown songlark, Cincloramphus cruralis
 Rufous songlark, Cincloramphus mathewsi
 Genus Buettikoferella – probably Locustellidae
 Buff-banded bushbird, Buettikoferella bivittata
 Genus Megalurulus – thicketbirds. Probably Locustellidae
 New Caledonian grassbird, Megalurulus mariei
 Bismarck thicketbird, Megalurulus grosvenori
 Bougainville thicketbird, Megalurulus llaneae
 Santo thicketbird, Megalurulus whitneyi
 Rusty thicketbird, Megalurulus rubiginosus
 Genus Trichocichla – long-legged warbler

Not in Sylvioidea
Entirely unrelated songbirds hitherto placed in Sylviidae

 Genus Amaurocichla – Apparently a Passeroidea; very close to, or part of the Motacillidae
 Bocage's longbill or São Tomé short-tail, Amaurocichla bocagei
 Genus Stenostira – Together with some "odd flycatchers", they form the new family Stenostiridae. They are closely related to Paridae (Beresford et al. 2005)
 Fairy flycatcher, Stenostira scita
 Genus Hyliota – hyliotas. Basal Passerida with no known relatives, perhaps somewhat closer to Promeropidae (sugarbirds)
 Yellow-bellied hyliota, Hyliota flavigaster
 Southern hyliota, Hyliota australis
 Usambara hyliota, Hyliota usambarae
 Violet-backed hyliota, Hyliota violacea
 Genus Newtonia – newtonias. Now in Vangidae (vangas); possibly polyphyletic (Yamagishi et al. 2001)
 Dark newtonia, Newtonia amphichroa
 Common newtonia, Newtonia brunneicauda
 Archbold's newtonia, Newtonia archboldi
 Red-tailed newtonia, Newtonia fanovanae – tentatively placed here

See also
 List of extinct birds

Notes

References 

Baker, K. (1997). Warblers of Europe, Asia, and North Africa. Helm .
 Supporting information
 Electronic appendix

{{cite journal | last1 = Cibois | first1 = A. | year = 2003b | title = Sylvia is a babbler: taxonomic implications for the families Sylviidae and Timaliidae | journal = Bull. B. O. C. | volume = 123 | pages = 257–261 }}

del Hoyo, J.; Elliot, A. & Christie D. (editors). (2006). Handbook of the Birds of the World. Volume 11: Old World Flycatchers to Old World Warblers. Lynx Edicions. .

Shirihai, H., Gargallo, G., & Helbig, A. J. (2001). Sylvia Warblers. Helm .
 Sibley, C. G. & Ahlquist, J. E. (1990). Phylogeny and classification of birds. Yale University Press, New Haven, Conn.
Simms, E. (1985). British warblers''. Collins, London. .

External links

 Old World warblers videos on the Internet Bird Collection
 

 

Bird common names